Exaeretia culcitella is a moth of the family Depressariidae. It is found in Ireland, Germany, the Czech Republic, Austria, Slovakia, Hungary, Italy, North Macedonia and Russia. 

Adults are on wing from June to July.

The larvae feed on Chrysanthemum corymbosum. They feed from spun together, undeveloped flowers of their host plant. Larvae can be found from April to May.

References

Moths described in 1854
Exaeretia
Moths of Europe